Emmanuelle Devos (born 10 May 1964) is a French actress. She is the daughter of actress Marie Henriau. She won the César Award for Best Actress in  2002  for her performance in Sur mes lèvres,  directed by  Jacques Audiard. She has also been nominated further three times for the award. She was a member of the Jury for the Main Competition section at the 2012 Cannes Film Festival.

Filmography

Awards and nominations

References

External links

 
Emmanuelle Devos - uniFrance
 

1964 births
Living people
French film actresses
Best Actress César Award winners
Best Supporting Actress César Award winners
Best Actress Lumières Award winners
People from Puteaux
20th-century French actresses
21st-century French actresses
Cours Florent alumni
French stage actresses
French television actresses